Jalal Kameli-Mofrad (born 15 May 1981 in Shadegan, Iran) is an Iranian football player

Club career
Kameli Mofrad started his career at Foolad FC. At first, due to his physical style, Mofrad played some good football and became a regular stater for his club. He was a member of the 2004–05 Foolad team that won the Iran's Premier League football championship. The season after though his performances significantly dropped in quality and he got less playing time. When Mayeli Kohan became the team's manager Mofrad, along with a number of the other well known Foolad players, left the club. In August 2006 he signed with Foolad's rival, Esteghlal Ahvaz but only stayed for one season. He then moved back to Foolad and played on the 2007–08 and 2008–09 seasons for them.

Club career statistics

 Assist Goals

International career
Jalal Kameli Mofrad was one of the players who won the gold medal in the football tournament of the 2002 Asian Games in Busan, South Korea, along with the Iran Olympic team. He had received his first cap for the national team, a number of weeks before that tournament on September 1, 2002 versus Jordan. He was a constant call up to the national team until 2005, but his poor form in the 2005–06 season cost him his spot in the national team.

Having been a couple of years away from Team Melli, in June 2007 he was once again called up to the national team and appeared in a friendly match against Mexico.

Honurs

Club
Persian Gulf Cup
2003–04 with Foolad

National
WAFF 2004

External links
 Jalal Kameli Mofrad at TeamMelli.com

1981 births
Mofrad, Jalal, Kameli
Iranian footballers
Foolad FC players
Esteghlal Ahvaz players
Persian Gulf Pro League players
Azadegan League players
Iran international footballers
2004 AFC Asian Cup players
Iranian Arab sportspeople
Asian Games gold medalists for Iran
Asian Games medalists in football
Footballers at the 2002 Asian Games
Association football defenders
Medalists at the 2002 Asian Games
People from Shadegan
Sportspeople from Khuzestan province
21st-century Iranian people